Rauman Pallo was a sports club established in 1949 from Rauma, Finland, playing football, bandy and ice hockey. It was dissolved in 1991 as the club merged with Pallo-Iirot. Rauman Pallo played mainly in the second and third tiers of Finnish football.

Notable former managers 
 Juha Malinen
 Hannu Touru

References 

Football clubs in Finland
Association football clubs established in 1949
Bandy clubs established in 1949
Defunct bandy clubs in Finland
Association football clubs disestablished in 1991
Rauma, Finland
Sport in Satakunta